Erik Jean Christian Antoine Belfrage (13 April 1946 – 18 April 2020) was a Swedish diplomat, banking executive, and political consultant.

Early life and education 
Belfrage was the son of diplomat Kurt-Allan Belfrage and his wife, Renée France Paule Puaux. His brother, Frank Belfrage, is an economist and diplomat. Belfrage graduated from Stockholm School of Economics in 1970.

Career 
Belfrage worked in the Ministry for Foreign Affairs from 1970 to 1987 as a diplomat in Geneva, Washington, D.C., Bucharest, Beirut, and Paris. In 1987, he became vice president at Skandinaviska Enskilda Banken and as an adviser to Investor AB. Belfrage also served as an advisor to Peter Wallenberg and the Wallenberg family between 1987 and 2012.

Death 
After suffering from COVID-19 during its pandemic, Belfrage died at Saint Göran Hospital in Stockholm on 18 April 2020.

References

1946 births
2020 deaths
Swedish diplomats
Swedish bankers
Swedish people of Scottish descent
Deaths from the COVID-19 pandemic in Sweden
Stockholm School of Economics alumni